Olivia Pigeot is an Australian actress. For her performance in the film A Cold Summer Pigeot was nominated for the 2004 AFI Award for Best Actress in a Leading Role Other roles include the 2011 TV mini series Paper Giants: The Birth of Cleo and Somersault.

References

External links
 

Living people
Australian film actresses
Australian stage actresses
Australian television actresses
Year of birth missing (living people)